Araneus marmoreus, commonly called the marbled orbweaver, is a species of spider belonging to the family Araneidae. It is sometimes also called the pumpkin spider from the resemblance of the female's inflated abdomen to an orange pumpkin. It has a Holarctic distribution.

Taxonomy
Araneus marmoreus was first described by Carl Alexander Clerck in 1757. In the same work, he also described Araneus pyramidatus, now regarded as a synonym of A. marmoreus.

Description

Two main forms of this species are known. The nominate variety has an orange abdomen with black or brown marbling while var. pyramidatus is much paler, sometimes almost white, with a single dark patch towards the rear of the abdomen. The nominate variety is found throughout the species' range while var. pyramidatus is more commonly found in Europe, where the two varieties are seldom found together. While the pyramidatus form is uncommon in North America, this pattern can be seen in the Northern part of the United States and into Canada. The female has a body length (excluding legs) of up to 18 mm while the male is rather smaller at 9 mm.

Adult female marbled orbweavers are 9 to 20 millimeters in length with very large oval, sub-spherical abdomens. The most common color morph is an orange abdomen with brown to black markings. However, this species has a wide range of colorations and folium patterns.  The abdomens can be pale yellow, white, black/brown, and red in color. The cephalothorax is commonly yellow to burnt-orange with a central dark line and dark lines down either side. The femurs are often red in color with black and white banding beginning on the tibia, metatarsus, and tarsus. The legs may instead have a light brown banded pattern. The venter has a black band enclosed by white brackets. 

Egg cocoons, which contain several hundred eggs, are generally deposited in October and are constructed of white silk formed in a flattened sphere. Immature spiders emerge from the cocoons in spring. Adults are seen from midsummer until the first hard freeze of fall.

Webs
The webs are found in trees, shrubs and tall weeds, and grasses in moist, wooded settings and can frequently be found along the banks of streams. The webs are oriented vertically and have a "signal" thread attached to the center that notifies the spider when prey has been captured. Unlike Argiope garden spiders, Araneus marmoreus hides in a silken retreat to the side of the web (at the end of the signal thread). The retreat can be made from leaves folded over and held together with silk, silk only, or under leaves and other debris.

Distribution
Araneus marmoreus has a Holarctic distribution, being found from North America through Europe to Japan. In North America, it is found throughout all of Canada to Alaska, the northern Rockies, from North Dakota to Texas, and then east to the Atlantic.

References

marmoreus
Holarctic spiders
Spiders described in 1757
Taxa named by Carl Alexander Clerck